Çankaya University is a private university in Ankara, Turkey. It was established on July 9, 1997, by the Sıtkı Alp Education Foundation. The university began its teaching in the Fall 1997 semester. Sıtkı Alp is the chairman of the board of trustees. English language is predominant medium of teaching, learning and research at the Çankaya University.

The 2020 Times Higher Education World University Rankings ranked the Çankaya University in the category of the top 401–500 internationally and as 87th among the Emerging Economies Universities. It was the first year that the university was the highest ranked university among both public and private universities in Turkey.

Academic programs
Çankaya University possesses 5 faculties with 21 departments; two institutes with 17 postgraduate master programs and 6 Ph.D. programs; 2 vocational schools with 3 programs; and one English preparatory school to support English language education.

One academic year consists of two semesters each of which includes at least 14 weeks. Lessons are designed for one semester.

History
Çankaya University is a university owned by a private foundation in Çankaya, Ankara, Turkey. The university was established by Sıtkı Alp, as a transition of his secondary education level school, the Arı Koleji, into a higher education institute, and opened by the former president of Turkey, Süleyman Demirel, in 1997.

In 2011, Turkuaz campus that is also known as New Campus opened. Many departments and faculties moved there. Area of Turkuaz campus is approximately 440.000 square meters. In addition, the new campus was awarded by the Arkitera Architecture Center.

Faculties and departments
 Faculty of Architecture includes Architecture, Industrial Design, Interior Architecture, Urban and Regional Planning
 Faculty of Arts and Sciences includes English Language and Literature, Mathematics, Translation and Interpreting Studies (English), Psychology
 Faculty of Economics and Administrative Sciences includes Banking and Finance, Business Administration (Management), Economics, International Trade, Political Science and International Relations
 Faculty of Engineering, includes Civil Engineering, Computer Engineering, Electronics and Communication Engineering, Industrial Engineering, Materials Science and Engineering, Mechanical Engineering, Mechatronics Engineering
 Faculty of Law 
 Vocational High School of Justice
 Çankaya Vocational Training School, including Banking and Insurance, International Trade
 Preparatory School of English

Institutes 
 Institute of Natural Sciences: 
 Computer Engineering - Master's degree
 Electronics and Communication Engineering - Master and Doctorate degree
 Industrial Engineering - Master's degree
 Mechanical Engineering - Master and Doctorate degree
 Maths-computer - Master
 Information technologies - Master
 Interior architect - Master
 Institute of Social Sciences:
 Business administration (MBA) - Master and Doctorate degree
 Human resources management - Master
 International trade and finance - Master
 Public law - Master and Doctorate degree
 Private law - Master and Doctorate degree
 English literature and Cultural studies - Master and Doctorate degree
 Financial economics - Master
 Political sciences - Master

Research centers
 Center for Entrepreneurship and Application of Innovation and Research
 Center for Research and Application in Law
 Center for Research and Application in Women's Studies
 Center for Research and Application in Atatürk's Principles and the Revolutionary History
 Center for Continuing Education, Consultation and Application

Sport club
Çankaya University Sports Club was established in 1986 as Arı Spor. Later, its name was changed as Çankaya University Sports Club. Currently, the sports club continues its activities at Çankaya University's Balgat Campus.

Affiliations
The university is a member of the Caucasus University Association.

References

External links

 

 
Educational institutions established in 1997
Çankaya, Ankara
1997 establishments in Turkey